Little Witch Academia is a 2017 anime television series created by Yoh Yoshinari and produced by Trigger, based on the original short films released in 2013 and 2015 respectively. Taking place in Luna Nova Magical Academy, a school for young witches, the series follows a new student named Atsuko "Akko" Kagari, who is determined to become a great witch like her idol named Shiny Chariot, who disappeared from the public ten years ago. After finding the mysterious staff called the Shiny Rod, Akko sets off on a journey to fully activate and properly use the Shiny Rod in hopes of finding out what truly happened to Shiny Chariot. The series was announced on June 24, 2016, following the final episode of Space Patrol Luluco, and aired in Japan from January 9 to June 25, 2017. Netflix began streaming the series' first 13 episodes with an English dub on June 30, 2017 globally while the remaining 12 was released as the show's second season on August 15, 2017. The series ran for 25 episodes released across nine Blu-ray Disc/DVD volumes.

Episode list

Notes
The seven transformations of the Shiny Rod as they appear in the anime series:
A. Shiny Arc: First introduced in episode 1. After the wielder chants the first word of Arcturus, "Noctu Orfei Aude Fraetor" ("Strive for your ideal place"), the Shiny Rod transforms into a bow and arrow, which can open portals that allow travel through the ley lines and can decimate a monster upon hitting its mark.
B. Shiny Ax: First introduced in episode 11. After the wielder chants the second word of Arcturus, "Phaidoari Afairynghor" ("You do not get the things that you dream of, you get the things you work for"), the Shiny Rod transforms into a great ax which can be used to launch a frontal attack, strong enough to damage Woodward's monstrous form.
C. Grappling Hook: First introduced in episode 13. After the wielder chants the third word of Arcturus, "Arae Aryrha" ("Do not compare yourself with others, do what only you can do"), the Shiny Rod transforms into a grappling hook that can be used to hold and pull large objects.
D. Shiny Sprinkler: First introduced in episode 16. After the wielder chants the fourth word of Arcturus, "Mayenab Dysheebudo" ("To see it through, patience is important"), the Shiny Rod transforms into a sprinkler that can quickly mix and spray any liquid.
E. Shiny Balai: First introduced in episode 20. After the wielder chants the fifth word of Arcturus, "Sybilladura Lelladybura" ("When traditional and modern powers mingle, the gate to an unseen world will open"), the Shiny Rod transforms into a magic broom which has incredible speed.
F. Lyonne: First introduced in episode 21. After the wielder chants the sixth word of Arcturus, "Lyonne" ("Thank you"), the Shiny Rod releases a powerful healing spell.
G. Grand Triskellion-Claiomh Solais: First introduced in episode 24. After the wielder chants the seventh word of Arcturus, "Phasansheer Shearylla" ("Connect with other people, and your dreams will grow"), the Shiny Rod can merge with the Grand Triskellion and form a golden cross, being able to use world-altering magic and improve previous transformations.

Footnotes

References

External links
  

Little Witch Academia